The Entente cordiale was a set of agreements between France and the United Kingdom.

Entente cordiale may also refer to:

Drama
Entente cordiale (film), 1939 French film
Entente cordiale, an episode of French TV drama Kaamelott
Entente Cordiale, an episode of British radio sitcom Hut 33
Entente Cordiale, an episode of British TV drama Bergerac 
Entente Cordiale, an episode of British TV drama Beryl's Lot
Entente Cordiale, an episode of British TV drama Special Branch
Entente Cordiale, an episode of British TV sitcom The Likely Lads

Music
Entente Cordiale (opera), opera by Ethel Smyth
Entente cordiale, composition for piano and orchestra by Alexandre Rabinovitch-Barakovsky

Transport
Entente Cordiale, a French ship wrecked in 1917 
Entente Cordiale, trainset built for Regional Eurostar

See also

Entente Cordiale Scholarships